Ancistrus tamboensis is a species of catfish in the family Loricariidae. It is native to South America, where it occurs in the Tambo River basin in the Ucayali River drainage of Peru. The species reaches 8.2 cm (3.2 inches) SL and is named for the river basin in which it occurs.

References 

tamboensis
Fish described in 1945
Catfish of South America
Fish of Peru
Taxa named by Henry Weed Fowler